Lake Jed Johnson, named for Jed Johnson (1888–1963), is third largest of thirteen small reservoirs in the Wichita Mountains National Wildlife Refuge, located in southwestern Oklahoma. Lawton, Oklahoma, southeast of the lake and the fourth largest city in the state, is the nearest major population center. Smaller communities of Cache, Medicine Park and Meers lie north of the lake.

General description
Its primary purpose is preservation of wildlife habitat.  and can be accessed by a boat ramp.

The surrounding area is home to deer, elk, Longhorn cattle and bison, and there are many opportunities for boating, fishing, hunting, and hiking throughout the refuge.

Tower and trail
The Jed Johnson Tower sits atop a hill near the lake. It is a former fire watch station that was constructed by the Civilian Conservation Corps (CCC) in 1941, before the U.S. formally entered World War II. Now abandoned, it is not open to visitors, reportedly because it is considered structurally unsound.

Users may bring along dogs, but only if they are on leash at all times.

See also
 Cache Creek
 Wichita Mountains
 Wichita Mountains Wildlife Refuge

References

External links 
 
 
 Wichita Mountains National Wildlife Refuge 

Protected areas of Comanche County, Oklahoma
Reservoirs in Oklahoma
Bodies of water of Comanche County, Oklahoma
Infrastructure completed in 1940